"Sub-Smash" is the eighth episode aired of the first series of UFO - a 1970 British television science fiction series about an alien invasion of Earth. The screenplay was written Alan Fennell and the director was David Lane. The episode was filmed between 18 November and 28 November 1969 and aired on the ATV Midlands on 11 November 1970. Though shown as the seventh episode, it was actually the seventeenth to have been filmed.

The series was created by Gerry Anderson and Sylvia Anderson with Reg Hill, and produced by the Andersons and Lew Grade's Century 21 Productions for Grade's ITC Entertainment company.

Story
When a freighter is sunk mid-Atlantic by an undersea UFO, Straker joins the crew on Skydiver to investigate despite his claustrophobia. As they search in the area where the ship was lost, Skydiver is attacked by the UFO and damaged, sinking to a ledge above the sea bed. However Skydiver is still able to launch Sky One, which tracks and destroys the UFO in Earth's atmosphere.

Each of Skydiver's crew except Lt. Barry must then take it in turn to use a single, faulty escape hatch that now takes 90 minutes to reset after each use. Straker orders Barry to use an alternate hatch which can only be employed once but, unbeknownst to him, it fails to open, trapping Barry. Two crew members reach the surface where Col. Freeman awaits them in an amphibious rescue aircraft but Lt. Tony Chin succumbs to his injuries on Skydiver.

Straker hears Barry's frantic yelling and frees her from the faulty hatch. They are the last two crew left on the submarine - Straker dealing with his claustrophobia - as the air is close to running out. Barry tells Straker that she's glad she won't die alone and that it's he who is with her (a reference to the episode "Confetti Check A-Ok" which reveals that Nina Barry was one of SHADO's founding operatives). Straker meanwhile has flashbacks to the significant events of his life: his marriage to Mary, the birth of their son John and John being hit by a car, as seen in the episodes "Confetti Check A-Ok" and "A Question Of Priorities". They finally manage to escape the sub when SHADO divers blow Skydiver off the ledge and they can access unblocked missile tubes.

Cast

Starring
 Ed Bishop — Commander Edward Straker
 George Sewell — Col. Alec E. Freeman
 Michael Billington — Col. Paul Foster
 Gary Myers — Capt. Lew Waterman
 Dolores Mantez — Lt. Nina Barry
 Keith Alexander — Lt. Keith Ford

Featuring
 Paul Maxwell — Lt. Jim Lewis	
 Anthony Chinn — Lt. Tony Chin	
 John Golightly — Holden	
 Burnell Tucker — Turner, Albatross pilot 
 Alan Haywood — Ross, SHADO diver	
 Suzanne Neve — Straker's ex-wife	
 Barnaby Shaw — Straker's son

Production notes
Anthony Chinn is one of 11 actors to appear in both Doppelgänger and the UFO series.

Locations included Neptune House at ATV Elstree Studios, Borehamwood; and Marlyn Cottage, Ley Hill, Buckinghamshire.

References

External links

1970 British television episodes
UFO (TV series) episodes